One Mission is a 2010 Album by Cantopop singer Sherman Chung (鍾舒漫).

Track list
The release includes the following tracks
CD
 童話國 (Wonderland)
 I Don't Worry
 拼圖 (Puzzle)
 買物提案 (Automatic Teller Machine)
 80之後 (After 80s)
 談判桌上 (Negotiate on Desk)
 強者的誕生 (Birth of Champion)
 信則有迷信則無 (Believe It Or Not)
 萬世風景 (Scenery)
 一天的愛有幾多 (How Much Love in One Day)

DVD
The CD+DVD edition includes a DVD with three MV:
 80之後
 童話國
 拼圖

2010 albums
Sherman Chung albums